Nizhnekrasnyansky is a rural locality (a khutor) in Mikhaylovskoye Rural Settlement, Uryupinsky District, Volgograd Oblast, Russia. The population was 80 as of 2010.

Geography 
Nizhnekrasnyansky is located in forest steppe, 20 km northeast of Uryupinsk (the district's administrative centre) by road. Vishnyakovsky is the nearest rural locality.

References 

Rural localities in Uryupinsky District